A constitutional referendum was held in Liberia on 1 May 1849, alongside general elections. The constitutional changes would increase the number of members of the House of Representatives for Sinoe County from one to three. The proposals were approved by voters.

Constitutional changes

References

1849 referendums
1849 in Liberia
Referendums in Liberia
Constitutional referendums in Liberia
May 1849 events